Disraeli ministry may refer to:

 
 First Disraeli ministry, the British minority government led by Benjamin Disraeli (February–December 1868)
 Second Disraeli ministry, the British majority government led by Benjamin Disraeli, 1st Earl of Beaconsfield (1874–1880)

See also
 Premierships of Benjamin Disraeli